The Beethoven–Haydn–Mozart Memorial is an outdoor memorial of 1904 to the classical composers Ludwig van Beethoven, Joseph Haydn and Wolfgang Amadeus Mozart, designed by Rudolf and Wolfgang Siemering and located in Tiergarten, Berlin, Germany. The monument was commissioned by Kaiser Wilhelm II. It suffered considerable damage during World War II and was only fully restored in 2005–2007.

See also
 1904 in art

References

External links
 

1904 establishments in Germany
1904 sculptures
Cultural depictions of Wolfgang Amadeus Mozart
Joseph Haydn
Monuments and memorials in Berlin
Monuments to composers
Outdoor sculptures in Berlin
Sculptures of Ludwig van Beethoven
Tiergarten (park)